Color Manila Run is a sports event series that specialised in concept-type of sporting events. The company is owned and operated by ColorManila Events, Inc., a for-profit company. It events started in Metro Manila, Philippines and as its popularity grew, it started mounting provincial events in other parts of the country . The main goal of the event is to remove the intimidation factor that comes in any mass participation sports event, they have removed timing in all their races, added five to six color stations along the race route- wherein every participant who crosses will be showered with color powder and everyone who are able to finish the race are given a finisher medal and a color packet. The color packet is part of the celebration activity that happens at the main village wherein everyone will throw their color packets in the air and start to party.

History

Founding
Color Manila Run, has taken the Philippines Tourism's slogan seriously which is "Its More Fun in The Philippines", and created series of fun filled sports events such as the classic morning run with color stations; an obstacle race called Color Manila Challenge wherein participants have to go through inflatable obstacles; third is the Color Manila Blacklight Run; it is the night version of its popular morning event, here, runners are given blacklight headlamps and the participants had to go through fluorescent color powder that are splashed at them creating a glow in every participants; fourth is its more playful fun run- Color Manila Costume Run and finally the Color Manila Women's Run, formerly known as Color Manila Glitter Run; both events have color stations along the route with a twist such as costume for the former and glitters for the latter. Color Manila Run was founded by Manila native and event organisers Julius Jorge Em and Justine Kayne Cordero in September 2012, in an effort to remove the intimidation factor of a regular running event, the first event took place in January 2013 in Bonifacio Global City, Taguig, with 5,000 participants.

References

Sports in Metro Manila
Marathons in the Philippines
Recurring sporting events established in 2012